Country Boy is the seventh studio album by American country music artist Ricky Skaggs. It was released in 1984 via Epic Records. The album peaked at number 1 on the Billboard Top Country Albums chart.

Track listing

Personnel 
 Ricky Skaggs – lead vocals, acoustic guitars, electric guitars, harmony vocals (1, 2, 6, 7, 10), mandolin (1, 3, 7, 10), backing vocals (4), fiddle (6)
 Gary Smith – acoustic piano (1, 2, 5, 8, 10)
 Dennis Burnside – acoustic piano (3, 4, 6, 7)
 Buck White – acoustic piano (9)
 Lou Reid – banjo (1, 10), harmony vocals (3, 10)
 Bill Monroe – mandolin (10)
 Bruce Bouton – steel guitar (1, 2, 5, 9, 10)
 Lloyd Green – steel guitar (3, 4, 6, 7)
 Buddy Emmons – steel guitar (8)
 Jesse Chambers – bass (1, 2, 5, 8, 9, 10)
 Joe Osborn – bass (3, 4, 6, 7)
 George Grantham – drums (1, 2, 5, 8, 9, 10)
 Eddie Bayers – drums (3, 4, 6, 7)
 Bobby Hicks – fiddle (1, 2, 3, 5, 8, 9, 10)
 Crom Tidwell – kazoo (1)
 Molly Bright – harmony vocals (6)

Production 
 Ricky Skaggs – producer 
 Marshall Morgan – engineer, mixing
 Robbie Rose – assistant engineer 
 Glenn Meadows – mastering at Masterfonics (Nashville, Tennessee)
 Jeff Morris – design 
 Joe Rogers – design
 Leonard Kamsler – photography 
 Chip Peay Productions – management

Charts

Weekly charts

Year-end charts

References

1984 albums
Ricky Skaggs albums
Epic Records albums
Albums produced by Ricky Skaggs